This is a list of machine guns and their variants.

The tables are sortable.

See also
List of firearms
List of multiple-barrel firearms

References

Machine guns